The Korea Democratic Party (KDP) was the leading opposition party in the first years of the First Republic of Korea. It existed from 1945 to 1949, when it merged with other opposition parties.

The U.S. military government has defined the KDP as conservatives with high educational standards, and believed they wanted Western democracy. However, modern South Korean political academia recognizes them as South Korea's first liberal party. However, unlike the current Democratic Party, the KDP was an right-wing anti-communist, Confucian conservative and economic liberal force hostile to communist forces in the north, advocating hatred and violence against leftists and socialists.

History
The KDP was established in 1945 by conservative nationalists headed by Song Jin-woo who were opposed to the People's Republic of Korea government set up by Lyuh Woon-hyung, instead backing the Provisional Government of the Republic of Korea. After Song was assassinated later in the year, he was succeeded as leader by Kim Seong-su. The Democratic Party won a third of the seats in the Interim Legislative Assembly elections in October 1946, and although it opposed the Assembly's existence due to some of its leadership being excluded, the party provided several of the key figures in the interim administration.

However, its closeness to the American occupation force, together with its association with the landed gentry, meant that it never gained significant popular support. In the May 1948 elections the party won only 29 of the 200 seats, and although it supported Syngman Rhee in the July 1948 presidential elections, none of its members were included in his cabinet, a snub that led to the party joining the opposition.

On 10 February 1949, it merged with other groups in the legislature to form the Democratic Nationalist Party.

Electoral results

See also 
 Song Jin-woo (journalist)

References

Defunct political parties in South Korea
Political parties established in 1945
Anti-communist parties
Anti-communism in South Korea
Classical liberal parties
Social conservative parties
Democratic parties in South Korea
1945 establishments in Korea
Political parties disestablished in 1949
1949 disestablishments in South Korea